Lee Jin-hee (born April 20, 1984) is a South Korean bobsledder who has competed since 2007. At the 2010 Winter Olympics in Vancouver, he finished 19th in the four-man event.

Lee's best finish at the FIBT World Championships was 20th in the four-man event at Lake Placid, New York in 2009. His best World Cup finish was 20th in the four-man event at Whistler, British Columbia in 2009.

Education
Kangnung National University

References

External links
 

1984 births
Bobsledders at the 2010 Winter Olympics
Living people
Olympic bobsledders of South Korea
South Korean male bobsledders